Ornithodoros alactagalis, the relapsing fever tick, is a species of soft tick in the family Argasidae.

References

Further reading

 

Ticks
Articles created by Qbugbot
Animals described in 1936